Willy nilly is an idiom that means "haphazardly" or "spontaneously". It may also refer to:

 Willy Nilly, a New Zealand television series
 Willy Nilly (comics), a British comic strip
 Willy Nilly, 1965 single by Rufus Thomas